Prashant Shah is a film producer based in Las Vegas, Los Angeles and the UK. He is the CEO and founder of Bollywood Hollywood Production Inc., a film and television production company that produces and shoots Bollywood movies in the UK, India, Canada, United States and South America. His latest films as a Producer titled ''Jungle Cry.

Career 
Prashant Shah (PS) first worked in a variety of industries including global marketing and business development in electronics. With education in computer science PS had IT consulting business related to biometric and security software applications. His experiences include F&B, healthcare staffing solutions. Currently in development a media-tech product, and products in F&B for 2021 launch.

Producer 
PS has more than 30 feature films & TV shows including "My Name is Khan, "Padman", "ZERO", "Roadies" and new releasing home production feature film "Jungle Cry" to his credits.

Selected filmography 

Shah's films include:

Notes

External links 
 
 

American people of Indian descent
American businesspeople
Living people
Year of birth missing (living people)